Four ships of the Imperial Russian Navy have been named Sviatoslav:

 , 80-gun ship of the 
 , 66-gun ship of the 
 , 74-gun ship of the 
 , 84-gun ship of the 

Russian Navy ship names